Paris Saint-Germain Football Club was founded in 1970. Since that time, PSG has competed in numerous nationally and internationally organised competitions, and 492 players have played in at least one match with the club's first team. 147 of these players have graduated from the Paris Saint-Germain Academy.

The list below features all players who have played in 100 or more such matches in official competitions for Paris Saint-Germain. Among them are club greats such as record appearance maker Jean-Marc Pilorget, leading top scorer Edinson Cavani, all-time assist leader Ángel Di María, record-breaking captain Thiago Silva, and African Footballer of the Year winner George Weah.

Other remarkable players include Zlatan Ibrahimović, Safet Sušić, Dominique Bathenay, Bernard Lama, Mustapha Dahleb, Luis Fernandez, Dominique Rocheteau, Raí, Pauleta, David Ginola, Ricardo, Valdo, Jay-Jay Okocha, and Jean-Pierre Dogliani.

Key

General

 Appearances and goals are for first-team official games, including those in Ligue 1, Ligue 2, Division 3, Coupe de France, Coupe de la Ligue, Trophée des Champions, UEFA Champions League, UEFA Europa League, UEFA Super Cup, FIFA Club World Cup, and several now-defunct competitions — namely the UEFA Cup Winners' Cup and UEFA Intertoto Cup. Substitute appearances are included.
 Players are listed according to the total number of games played. If two or more players are tied, their rankings are determined as follows:

Table headers

 Player – Nationality, first name and last name.
 Position – Role on the field of play.
 Paris Saint-Germain – Playing career at the club.
 Appearances – Number of games played.
 Goals – Number of goals scored.
 Assists – Number of assists delivered.
 Source – Reference source of the player's information.

Positions and colors

Players

Statistics correct as of match played 29 January 2023. Bold denotes an active player for the club.

300+ appearances

200–299 appearances

100–199 appearances

References

External links
PSG.FR – Paris Saint-Germain Official Website
Paris Saint-Germain – Ligue 1
Paris Saint-Germain - UEFA.com

 
Paris Saint-Germain F.C.
Association football player non-biographical articles
Paris Saint-Germain F.C. players